Mikhail Gigolashvili (born 1954) is a Georgian-born writer who is mainly known for his Russian-language novels. He was born and raised in Tbilisi, and obtained his doctorate from Tbilisi University. He specialized in Dostoyevsky, and has stated that for a whole decade, he read nothing but Dostoevsky while he wrote his dissertation.

He is best known for his novels The Interpreter and The Devil’s Wheel; the latter, set in perestroika-era Tbilisi, was nominated for the Big Book Award. 
Since 1991, he has lived in Germany, where he teaches Russian at Saarland University.

Works
 1978 — novel «Иудея»
 2003 — novel «Толмач»
 2007 — «Тайнопись»
 2009 — novel «Чёртово колесо»
 2012 — novel «Захват Московии»
 2017 — novel «Тайный год»
 2020 — novel «Иудея, I век»
 2021 — novel «Кока»

References

People from Tbilisi
1954 births
Living people

ru:Гиголашвили, Михаил Георгиевич